This is an incomplete list of Statutory Rules of Northern Ireland in 2003.

1-100

 Plastic Materials and Articles in Contact with Food (Amendment) Regulations (Northern Ireland) 2003 (S.R. 2003 No. 2)
 Companies (Northern Ireland) Order 1986 (Electronic Communications) Order (Northern Ireland) 2003 (S.R. 2003 No. 3)
 Companies (Principal Business Activities) (Amendment) Regulations (Northern Ireland) 2003 (S.R. 2003 No. 4)
 Foreign Companies (Execution of Documents) Regulations (Northern Ireland) 2003 (S.R. 2003 No. 5)
 General Medical Services (Amendment) Regulations (Northern Ireland) 2003 (S.R. 2003 No. 6)
 Anti-Pollution Works Regulations (Northern Ireland) 2003 (S.R. 2003 No. 7)
 Road Vehicles (Testing) (Disclosure of Information) Regulations (Northern Ireland) 2003 (S.R. 2003 No. 8)
 Animal By-Products (Identification) (Amendment) Regulations (Northern Ireland) 2003 (S.R. 2003 No. 9)
 Kava-kava in Food Regulations (Northern Ireland) 2003 (S.R. 2003 No. 10)
 Road Service Licensing (Amendment) Regulations (Northern Ireland) 2003 (S.R. 2003 No. 14)
 Gaming (Variation of Monetary Limits) Order (Northern Ireland) 2003 (S.R. 2003 No. 15)
 Intercountry Adoption (Hague Convention) Regulations (Northern Ireland) 2003 (S.R. 2003 No. 16)
 Magistrates' Courts (Detention and Forfeiture of Seized Cash) Rules (Northern Ireland) 2003 (S.R. 2003 No. 17)
 Social Security Commissioners (Procedure) (Tax Credits Appeals) Regulations (Northern Ireland) 2003 (S.R. 2003 No. 18)
 Road Vehicles Lighting (Amendment) Regulations (Northern Ireland) 2003 (S.R. 2003 No. 19)
 Livestock and Meat Commission (Maximum Levy) Regulations (Northern Ireland) 2003 (S.R. 2003 No. 20)
 Livestock and Meat Commission (Levy) Regulations (Northern Ireland) 2003 (S.R. 2003 No. 21)
 Disability Discrimination Act 1995 (Commencement No. 9) Order (Northern Ireland) 2003 (S.R. 2003 No. 24)
 State Pension Credit Regulations (Northern Ireland) 2003 (S.R. 2003 No. 28)
 State Pension Credit (2002 Act) (Commencement No. 2) Order (Northern Ireland) 2003 (S.R. 2003 No. 29)
 Valuation for Rating (Decapitalisation Rate) Regulations (Northern Ireland) 2003 (S.R. 2003 No. 30)
 Valuation for Rating (Plant and Machinery) Order (Northern Ireland) 2003 (S.R. 2003 No. 31)
 Magistrates' Courts (Sex Offender Orders) (Amendment) Rules (Northern Ireland) 2003 (S.R. 2003 No. 32)
 Control of Asbestos at Work Regulations (Northern Ireland) 2003 (S.R. 2003 No. 33)
 Control of Substances Hazardous to Health Regulations (Northern Ireland) 2003 (S.R. 2003 No. 34)
 Control of Lead at Work Regulations (Northern Ireland) 2003 (S.R. 2003 No. 35)
 Notification of New Substances (Amendment) Regulations (Northern Ireland) 2003 (S.R. 2003 No. 36)
 Public Service Vehicles Accessibility Regulations (Northern Ireland) 2003 (S.R. 2003 No. 37)
 Public Service Vehicles (Conditions of Fitness, Equipment and Use) (Amendment) Regulations (Northern Ireland) 2003 (S.R. 2003 No. 38)
 Motor Vehicles (Construction and Use) (Amendment) Regulations (Northern Ireland) 2003 (S.R. 2003 No. 39)
 Public Service Vehicles (Amendment) Regulations (Northern Ireland) 2003 (S.R. 2003 No. 40)
 Planning (Fees) (Amendment) Regulations (Northern Ireland) 2003 (S.R. 2003 No. 41)
 Seeds (Miscellaneous Amendments) Regulations (Northern Ireland) 2003 (S.R. 2003 No. 42)
 Legal Aid (Remuneration of Solicitors and Counsel in County Court Proceedings) (Amendment) Order (Northern Ireland) 2003 (S.R. 2003 No. 43)
 Social Security (Overlapping Benefits) (Amendment) Regulations (Northern Ireland) 2003 (S.R. 2003 No. 44)
 Social Security and Child Support (Decisions and Appeals) (Amendment) Regulations (Northern Ireland) 2003 (S.R. 2003 No. 45)
 Pollution Prevention and Control Regulations (Northern Ireland) 2003 (S.R. 2003 No. 46)
 Miscellaneous Charges (Amendments) Regulations (Northern Ireland) 2003 (S.R. 2003 No. 48)
 Environment (Northern Ireland) (2002 Order) (Commencement No. 1) Order (Northern Ireland) 2003 (S.R. 2003 No. 49)
 Health and Safety at Work Order (Application to Environmentally Hazardous Substances) Regulations (Northern Ireland) 2003 (S.R. 2003 No. 52)
 Child Support, Pensions and Social Security (2000 Act) (Commencement No. 9) Order (Northern Ireland) 2003 (S.R. 2003 No. 53)
 Rules of the Supreme Court (Northern Ireland) (Amendment) 2003 (S.R. 2003 No. 54)
 Blue Tongue Order (Northern Ireland) 2003 (S.R. 2003 No. 55)
 Child Support (Applications: Prescribed Date) Regulations (Northern Ireland) 2003 (S.R. 2003 No. 56)
 Social Security (Child Maintenance Premium and Miscellaneous Amendments) (Amendment) Regulations (Northern Ireland) 2003 (S.R. 2003 No. 57)
 Local Government (General Grant) Regulations (Northern Ireland) 2003 (S.R. 2003 No. 58)
 Sea Fishing (Restriction on Days at Sea) Order (Northern Ireland) 2003 (S.R. 2003 No. 59)
 Police Service of Northern Ireland and Police Service of Northern Ireland Reserve (Full-Time) (Severance) Regulations 2003 (S.R. 2003 No. 60)
 Local Government (Early Termination of Employment) (Discretionary Compensation) Regulations (Northern Ireland) 2003 (S.R. 2003 No. 61)
 Registered Rents (Increase) Order (Northern Ireland) 2003 (S.R. 2003 No. 62)
 Social Security (Industrial Injuries) (Prescribed Diseases) (Amendment) Regulations (Northern Ireland) 2003 (S.R. 2003 No. 63)
 Motor Vehicles (Driving Licences) (Amendment) Regulations (Northern Ireland) 2003 (S.R. 2003 No. 64)
 Motor Cars (Driving Instruction) (Amendment) Regulations (Northern Ireland) 2003 (S.R. 2003 No. 65)
 Police (Northern Ireland) Act 2000 (Commencement No. 5) Order 2003 (S.R. 2003 No. 66)
 Police Service of Northern Ireland (Conduct) Regulations 2003 (S.R. 2003 No. 68)
 Health and Personal Social Services (2001 Act) (Commencement No. 5) Order (Northern Ireland) 2003 (S.R. 2003 No. 69)
 Potatoes Originating in Egypt (Amendment) Regulations (Northern Ireland) 2003 (S.R. 2003 No. 70)
 Crown Court (Amendment) Rules (Northern Ireland) 2003 (S.R. 2003 No. 71)
 Valuation (Railways) Regulations (Northern Ireland) 2003 (S.R. 2003 No. 72)
 Revaluation (Consequential Provisions) Order (Northern Ireland) 2003 (S.R. 2003 No. 73)
 General Ophthalmic Services (Amendment) Regulations (Northern Ireland) 2003 (S.R. 2003 No. 74)
 Family Proceedings (Amendment) Rules (Northern Ireland) 2003 (S.R. 2003 No. 75)
 Railways (Rateable Value) Order (Northern Ireland) 2003 (S.R. 2003 No. 76)
 Valuation (Electricity) Order (Northern Ireland) 2003 (S.R. 2003 No. 77)
 Rates (Regional Rates) Order (Northern Ireland) 2003 (S.R. 2003 No. 78)
 Plant Protection Products (Amendment) Regulations (Northern Ireland) 2003 (S.R. 2003 No. 79)
 Housing Benefit (General) (Amendment) Regulations (Northern Ireland) 2003 (S.R. 2003 No. 80)
 Motor Vehicles (Driving Licences) (Designation of Relevant External Law) Order (Northern Ireland) 2003 (S.R. 2003 No. 83)
 Child Support and Social Security (Miscellaneous Amendments) Regulations (Northern Ireland) 2003 (S.R. 2003 No. 84)
 Social Security Pensions (Low Earnings Threshold) Order (Northern Ireland) 2003 (S.R. 2003 No. 85)
 Teachers' Superannuation (Additional Voluntary Contributions) (Amendment) Regulations (Northern Ireland) 2003 (S.R. 2003 No. 86)
 Infected Waters (Infectious Pancreatic Necrosis) Order (Northern Ireland) 2003 (S.R. 2003 No. 87)
 Legal Aid (Financial Conditions) Regulations (Northern Ireland) 2003 (S.R. 2003 No. 88)
 Legal Advice and Assistance (Financial Conditions) Regulations (Northern Ireland) 2003 (S.R. 2003 No. 89)
 Legal Advice and Assistance (Amendment) Regulations (Northern Ireland) 2003 (S.R. 2003 No. 90)
 Child Support and Social Security (Transitional Provision) (Miscellaneous Amendments) Regulations (Northern Ireland) 2003 (S.R. 2003 No. 91)
 Child Support, Pensions and Social Security (2000 Act) (Commencement No. 10) Order (Northern Ireland) 2003 (S.R. 2003 No. 92)
 Valuation (Telecommunications) Regulations (Northern Ireland) 2003 (S.R. 2003 No. 93)
 Legal Advice and Assistance (Amendment No. 2) Regulations (Northern Ireland) 2003 (S.R. 2003 No. 94)
 Radioactive Substances (Natural Gas) Exemption Order (Northern Ireland) 2003 (S.R. 2003 No. 95)
 Industrial Pollution Control (Prescribed Processes and Substances) (Amendment) Regulations (Northern Ireland) 2003 (S.R. 2003 No. 96)
 Environmental Protection (Controls on Ozone-Depleting Substances) Regulations (Northern Ireland) 2003 (S.R. 2003 No. 97)
 Planning (General Development) (Amendment) Order (Northern Ireland) 2003 (S.R. 2003 No. 98)
 Public Service Vehicles (Licence Fees) (Amendment) Regulations (Northern Ireland) 2003 (S.R. 2003 No. 99)
 Motor Vehicles (Driving Licences) (Amendment) (Test Fees) Regulations (Northern Ireland) 2003 (S.R. 2003 No. 100)

101-200

 Motor Vehicle Testing (Amendment) (Fees) Regulations (Northern Ireland) 2003 (S.R. 2003 No. 101)
 Goods Vehicles (Testing) (Fees) (Amendment) Regulations (Northern Ireland) 2003 (S.R. 2003 No. 102)
 Administration of Insolvent Estates of Deceased Persons (Amendment) Order (Northern Ireland) 2003 (S.R. 2003 No. 103)
 Livestock and Meat Commission (Levy) (No. 2) Regulations (Northern Ireland) 2003 (S.R. 2003 No. 104)
 Marketing and Use of Dangerous Substances Regulations (Northern Ireland) 2003 (S.R. 2003 No. 105)
 Marketing and Use of Dangerous Substances (No. 2) Regulations (Northern Ireland) 2003 (S.R. 2003 No. 106)
 Social Security (Work-focused Interviews for Lone Parents Amendment) Regulations (Northern Ireland) 2003 (S.R. 2003 No. 107)
 Housing Benefit (General) (Amendment No. 2) Regulations (Northern Ireland) 2003 (S.R. 2003 No. 108)
 Disability Discrimination (Providers of Services) (Adjustment of Premises) Regulations (Northern Ireland) 2003 (S.R. 2003 No. 109)
 Further Education (Amendment of Governing Bodies' Powers) Order (Northern Ireland) 2003 (S.R. 2003 No. 110)
 M1/A1 (Sprucefield Interchange) Order (Northern Ireland) 2003 (S.R. 2003 No. 112)
 Environment (Northern Ireland) (2002 Order) (Commencement No. 2) Order (Northern Ireland) 2003 (S.R. 2003 No. 113)
 Foyle Area and Carlingford Area (Licensing of Fishing Engines) (Amendment) Regulations 2003 (S.R. 2003 No. 114)
 Zoos Licensing Regulations (Northern Ireland) 2003 (S.R. 2003 No. 115)
 Social Fund (Maternity and Funeral Expenses) (General) (Amendment) Regulations (Northern Ireland) 2003 (S.R. 2003 No. 117)
 Social Security (Claims and Payments) (Amendment) Regulations (Northern Ireland) 2003 (S.R. 2003 No. 118)
 Working Time (Amendment) Regulations (Northern Ireland) 2003 (S.R. 2003 No. 119)
 Strategic Investment and Regeneration of Sites (Designation) Order (Northern Ireland) 2003 (S.R. 2003 No. 120)
 Education (Student Support) (Amendment) Regulations (Northern Ireland) 2003 (S.R. 2003 No. 121)
 Magistrates' Courts (Proceeds of Crime Act 2002) (Confiscation) Rules (Northern Ireland) 2003 (S.R. 2003 No. 122)
 Pesticides (Maximum Residue Levels in Crops, Food and Feeding Stuffs) (Amendment) Regulations (Northern Ireland) 2003 (S.R. 2003 No. 123)
 Motor Vehicles (Approval) (Amendment) Regulations (Northern Ireland) 2003 (S.R. 2003 No. 124)
 Councillors (Travelling and Subsistence Allowances) (Amendment) Regulations (Northern Ireland) 2003 (S.R. 2003 No. 125)
 Valuation for Rating (Docks) Order (Northern Ireland) 2003 (S.R. 2003 No. 129)
 General Medical Services (Amendment No. 2) Regulations (Northern Ireland) 2003 (S.R. 2003 No. 133)
 Dental Charges (Amendment) Regulations (Northern Ireland) 2003 (S.R. 2003 No. 134)
 General Dental Services (Amendment) Regulations (Northern Ireland) 2003 (S.R. 2003 No. 135)
 Harbour Works (Environmental Impact Assessment) Regulations (Northern Ireland) 2003 (S.R. 2003 No. 136)
 Juvenile Justice Board (Transfer of Functions) Order (Northern Ireland) 2003 (S.R. 2003 No. 137)
 Social Care Tribunals Rules (Northern Ireland) 2003 (S.R. 2003 No. 138)
 Northern Ireland Social Care Council (Description of Social Care Workers) Order (Northern Ireland) 2003 (S.R. 2003 No. 139)
 Financial Investigations (Northern Ireland) Order 2001 (Commencement) Order 2003 (S.R. 2003 No. 140)
 Proceeds of Crime (Northern Ireland) Order 1996 (Code of Practice) (Commencement) Order 2003 (S.R. 2003 No. 141)
 Police (Northern Ireland) Act 1998 (Commencement No. 5) Order (Northern Ireland) 2003 (S.R. 2003 No. 142)
 Rates (Transitional Relief) Order (Northern Ireland) 2003 (S.R. 2003 No. 1434)
 Insolvent Partnerships (Amendment) Order (Northern Ireland) 2003 (S.R. 2003 No. 144)
 Motor Vehicles (Construction and Use) (Amendment No. 2) Regulations (Northern Ireland) 2003 (S.R. 2003 No. 145)
 Social Security Revaluation of Earnings Factors Order (Northern Ireland) 2003 (S.R. 2003 No. 146)
 Teachers' Superannuation (Amendment) Regulations (Northern Ireland) 2003 (S.R. 2003 No. 147)
 M1-M2 Link (Belfast) Order (Northern Ireland) 2003 (S.R. 2003 No. 149)
 Guaranteed Minimum Pensions Increase Order (Northern Ireland) 2003 (S.R. 2003 No. 150)
 Social Security (Credits) (Amendment) Regulations (Northern Ireland) 2003 (S.R. 2003 No. 151)
 Dangerous Substances and Explosive Atmospheres Regulations (Northern Ireland) 2003 (S.R. 2003 No. 152)
 Charges for Drugs and Appliances (Amendment) Regulations (Northern Ireland) 2003 (S.R. 2003 No. 153)
 Social Security (Miscellaneous Amendments) Regulations (Northern Ireland) 2003 (S.R. 2003 No. 154)
 Social Security Benefits Up-rating Order (Northern Ireland) 2003 (S.R. 2003 No. 155)
 Social Security Benefits Up-rating Regulations (Northern Ireland) 2003 (S.R. 2003 No. 156)
 Social Security (Industrial Injuries) (Dependency) (Permitted Earnings Limits) Order (Northern Ireland) 2003 (S.R. 2003 No. 157)
 Miscellaneous Food Additives (Amendment) Regulations (Northern Ireland) 2003 (S.R. 2003 No. 158)
 Food Labelling (Amendment) Regulations (Northern Ireland) 2003 (S.R. 2003 No. 159)
 Fish Labelling Regulations (Northern Ireland) 2003 (S.R. 2003 No. 160)
 Social Security (Earnings Factor) (Amendment) Regulations (Northern Ireland) 2003 (S.R. 2003 No. 161)
 Less Favoured Area Compensatory Allowances Regulations (Northern Ireland) 2003 (S.R. 2003 No. 162)
 Departments (Transfer of Functions) Order (Northern Ireland) 2003 (S.R. 2003 No. 163)
 Workmen's Compensation (Supplementation) (Amendment) Regulations (Northern Ireland) 2003 (S.R. 2003 No. 164)
 Marketing and Use of Dangerous Substances (No. 3) Regulations (Northern Ireland) 2003 (S.R. 2003 No. 165)
 Education (Student Loans) (Repayment) (Amendment) Regulations (Northern Ireland) 2003 (S.R. 2003 No. 166)
 Genetically Modified Organisms (Deliberate Release) Regulations (Northern Ireland) 2003 (S.R. 2003 No. 167)
 Social Security (Maternity Allowance) (Earnings) (Amendment) Regulations (Northern Ireland) 2003 (S.R. 2003 No. 168)
 Pensions Increase (Review) Order (Northern Ireland) 2003 (S.R. 2003 No. 169)
 Travelling Expenses and Remission of Charges (Amendment) Regulations (Northern Ireland) 2003 (S.R. 2003 No. 170)
 Housing Support Services (2002 Order) (Commencement) Order (Northern Ireland) 2003 (S.R. 2003 No. 171)
 Housing Support Services Regulations (Northern Ireland) 2003 (S.R. 2003 No. 172)
 Flexible Working (Procedural Requirements) Regulations (Northern Ireland) 2003 (S.R. 2003 No. 173)
 Flexible Working (Eligibility, Complaints and Remedies) Regulations (Northern Ireland) 2003 (S.R. 2003 No. 174)
 Plant Health (Wood and Bark) (Phytophthora ramorum) Order (Northern Ireland) 2003 (S.R. 2003 No. 175)
 Optical Charges and Payments and General Ophthalmic Services (Amendment) Regulations (Northern Ireland) 2003 (S.R. 2003 No. 176)
 Natural Mineral Water, Spring Water and Bottled Drinking Water (Amendment) Regulations (Northern Ireland) 2003 (S.R. 2003 No. 182)
 Motor Vehicles (Driving Licences) (Amendment No. 2) Regulations (Northern Ireland) 2003 (S.R. 2003 No. 183)
 Police Service of Northern Ireland (Amendment) Regulations 2003 (S.R. 2003 No. 184)
 Valuation (Natural Gas Undertaking) Regulations (Northern Ireland) 2003 (S.R. 2003 No. 185)
 Valuation (Water Undertaking) Regulations (Northern Ireland) 2003 (S.R. 2003 No. 186)
 Housing Benefit (General) (Amendment No. 4) Regulations (Northern Ireland) 2003 (S.R. 2003 No. 187)
 Planning (Amendment) (2003 Order) (Commencement No. 1) Order (Northern Ireland) 2003 (S.R. 2003 No. 188)
 Housing Benefit (General) (Amendment No. 3) Regulations (Northern Ireland) 2003 (S.R. 2003 No. 189)
 State Pension Credit (Consequential, Transitional and Miscellaneous Provisions) Regulations (Northern Ireland) 2003 (S.R. 2003 No. 191)
 Slaughter Premium (Amendment) Regulations (Northern Ireland) 2003 (S.R. 2003 No. 192)
 Plant Health (Phytophthora ramorum) Order (Northern Ireland) 2003 (S.R. 2003 No. 193)
 Surface Waters (Fishlife) (Classification) (Amendment) Regulations (Northern Ireland) 2003 (S.R. 2003 No. 194)
 Social Security (Working Tax Credit and Child Tax Credit Consequential Amendments) Regulations (Northern Ireland) 2003 (S.R. 2003 No. 195)
 Income-Related Benefits and Jobseeker's Allowance (Working Tax Credit and Child Tax Credit Amendment No. 2) Regulations (Northern Ireland) 2003 (S.R. 2003 No. 196)
 Housing Benefit (State Pension Credit) Regulations (Northern Ireland) 2003 (S.R. 2003 No. 197)
 Health and Social Services Trusts (Exercise of Functions) (Amendment) Regulations (Northern Ireland) 2003 (S.R. 2003 No. 200)

201-300

 Carers and Direct Payments (2002 Act) (Commencement No. 1) Order (Northern Ireland) 2003 (S.R. 2003 No. 201)
 Welfare Foods (Amendment) Regulations (Northern Ireland) 2003 (S.R. 2003 No. 202)
 Energy (2003 Order) (Commencement No. 1) Order (Northern Ireland) 2003 (S.R. 2003 No. 203)
 Welfare Reform and Pensions (1999 Order) (Commencement No. 13) Order (Northern Ireland) 2003 (S.R. 2003 No. 204)
 General Medical Services (Amendment No. 3) Regulations (Northern Ireland) 2003 (S.R. 2003 No. 205)
 Genetically Modified Organisms (Deliberate Release) (Amendment) Regulations (Northern Ireland) 2003 (S.R. 2003 No. 206)
 Fire Services (Appointments and Promotion) (Amendment) Regulations (Northern Ireland) 2003 (S.R. 2003 No. 207)
 Radioactive Substances (Basic Safety Standards) Regulations (Northern Ireland) 2003 (S.R. 2003 No. 208)
 Environment (Designation of Relevant Directives) Order (Northern Ireland) 2003 (S.R. 2003 No. 209)
 Large Combustion Plants Regulations (Northern Ireland) 2003 (S.R. 2003 No. 210)
 State Pension Credit (2002 Act) (Commencement No. 3) Order (Northern Ireland) 2003 (S.R. 2003 No. 211)
 Tax Credits Act 2002 (Transitional Provisions and Savings) Order (Northern Ireland) 2003 (S.R. 2003 No. 212)
 Social Security (Working Tax Credit and Child Tax Credit Consequential Amendments No. 2) Regulations (Northern Ireland) 2003 (S.R. 2003 No. 213)
 Traffic Signs (Amendment) Regulations (Northern Ireland) 2003 (S.R. 2003 No. 214)
 Products of Animal Origin (Third Country Imports) (Amendment) Regulations (Northern Ireland) 2003 (S.R. 2003 No. 215)
 Road Transport (Qualifications of Operators) (Amendment) Regulations (Northern Ireland) 2003 (S.R. 2003 No. 217)
 Feeding Stuffs (Amendment) Regulations (Northern Ireland) 2003 (S.R. 2003 No. 219)
 Employment Rights (Northern Ireland) Order 1996 (Application of Article 112B to Adoptions from Overseas) Regulations (Northern Ireland) 2003 (S.R. 2003 No. 220)
 Social Security Contributions and Benefits (Northern Ireland) Act 1992 (Application of Parts XIIZA and XIIZB to Adoptions from Overseas) Regulations (Northern Ireland) 2003 (S.R. 2003 No. 221)
 Paternity and Adoption Leave (Adoption from Overseas) Regulations (Northern Ireland) 2003 (S.R. 2003 No. 222)
 Statutory Paternity Pay (Adoption) and Statutory Adoption Pay (Adoption from Overseas) Regulations (Northern Ireland) 2003 (S.R. 2003 No. 223)
 Social Security and Child Support (Miscellaneous Amendments) Regulations (Northern Ireland) 2003 (S.R. 2003 No. 224)
 Carers (Services) and Direct Payments Regulations (Northern Ireland) 2003 (S.R. 2003 No. 226)
 Lands Tribunal (Salaries) Order (Northern Ireland) 2003 (S.R. 2003 No. 227)
 Social Security (Incapacity Benefit) (Her Majesty's Forces) (Amendment) Regulations (Northern Ireland) 2003 (S.R. 2003 No. 231)
 Police (Northern Ireland) Act 2000 (Designated Places of Detention) Order 2003 (S.R. 2003 No. 232)
 Gaming (Bingo) Regulations (Northern Ireland) 2003 (S.R. 2003 No. 233)
 Housing Renovation etc. Grants (Reduction of Grant) (Amendment) Regulations (Northern Ireland) 2003 (S.R. 2003 No. 234)
 Plant Health (Amendment) Order (Northern Ireland) 2003 (S.R. 2003 No. 235)
 Street Works Register (Registration Fees) Regulations (Northern Ireland) 2003 (S.R. 2003 No. 236)
 Police (Northern Ireland) Act 2000 (Continuance of Office of Commissioner) Order 2003 (S.R. 2003 No. 237)
 Health and Personal Social Services (Quality, Improvement and Regulation) (2003 Order) (Commencement No. 1) Order (Northern Ireland) 2003 (S.R. 2003 No. 239)
 Air Quality (Ozone) Regulations (Northern Ireland) 2003 (S.R. 2003 No. 240)
 Employment Rights (Increase of Limits) Order (Northern Ireland) 2003 (S.R. 2003 No. 241)
 Infected Waters (Infectious Pancreatic Necrosis) Revocation Order (Northern Ireland) 2003 (S.R. 2003 No. 242)
 Infected Waters (Infectious Pancreatic Necrosis) (No. 2) Order (Northern Ireland) 2003 (S.R. 2003 No. 243)
 Welfare of Farmed Animals (Amendment) Regulations (Northern Ireland) 2003 (S.R. 2003 No. 244)
 Bangor (Harbour Area) Order (Northern Ireland) 2003 (S.R. 2003 No. 249)
 Groomsport (Harbour Area) Order (Northern Ireland) 2003 (S.R. 2003 No. 250)
 Ballycastle (Harbour Area) Order (Northern Ireland) 2003 (S.R. 2003 No. 251)
 Rathlin (Harbour Area) Order (Northern Ireland) 2003 (S.R. 2003 No. 252)
 Audit and Accountability (Northern Ireland) Order 2003 (Statutory Right of Access: Exclusions) Order (Northern Ireland) 2003 (S.R. 2003 No. 253)
 Decisions on Appeals and Making of Reports Rules (Northern Ireland) 2003 (S.R. 2003 No. 254)
 Registration of Foreign Adoptions Regulations (Northern Ireland) 2003 (S.R. 2003 No. 255)
 Social Security and Pensions (Financial Services and Markets Act 2000) (Consequential Amendments) Regulations (Northern Ireland) 2003 (S.R. 2003 No. 256)
 Sweeteners in Food (Amendment) Regulations (Northern Ireland) 2003 (S.R. 2003 No. 257)
 Protection of Water Against Agricultural Nitrate Pollution Regulations (Northern Ireland) 2003 (S.R. 2003 No. 259)
 Social Security (Hospital In-Patients and Miscellaneous Amendments) Regulations (Northern Ireland) 2003 (S.R. 2003 No. 261)
 Rules of the Supreme Court (Northern Ireland) (Amendment No. 2) 2003 (S.R. 2003 No. 263)
 Social Fund (Maternity and Funeral Expenses) (General) (Amendment No. 2) Regulations (Northern Ireland) 2003 (S.R. 2003 No. 264)
 Justice (Northern Ireland) Act 2002 (Commencement No. 3) Order 2003 (S.R. 2003 No. 265)
 Social Security (Removal of Residential Allowance and Miscellaneous Amendments) Regulations (Northern Ireland) 2003 (S.R. 2003 No. 267)
 Whole of Government Accounts (Designation of Bodies) (Northern Ireland) Order 2003 (S.R. 2003 No. 268)
 Housing (2003 Order) (Commencement No. 1) Order (Northern Ireland) 2003 (S.R. 2003 No. 270)
 Fisheries (Amendment) Byelaws (Northern Ireland) 2003 (S.R. 2003 No. 271)
 County Court (Amendment) Rules (Northern Ireland) 2003 (S.R. 2003 No. 272)
 Food Supplements Regulations (Northern Ireland) 2003 (S.R. 2003 No. 273)
 Social Security (Work-focused Interviews) Regulations (Northern Ireland) 2003 (S.R. 2003 No. 274)
 Motor Vehicles (Approval) (Amendment No. 2) (Revocation) Regulations (Northern Ireland) 2003 (S.R. 2003 No. 275)
 Statutory Paternity Pay (Adoption) and Statutory Adoption Pay (Adoptions from Overseas) (Administration) Regulations (Northern Ireland) 2003 (S.R. 2003 No. 276)
 Statutory Paternity Pay (Adoption) and Statutory Adoption Pay (Adoptions from Overseas) (Persons Abroad and Mariners) Regulations (Northern Ireland) 2003 (S.R. 2003 No. 277)
 Urban Waste Water Treatment (Amendment) Regulations (Northern Ireland) 2003 (S.R. 2003 No. 278)
 Crown Court (Amendment No. 2) Rules (Northern Ireland) 2003 (S.R. 2003 No. 279)
 Housing Renovation etc. Grants (Reduction of Grant) (Amendment No. 2) Regulations (Northern Ireland) 2003 (S.R. 2003 No. 282)
 Planning Applications (Exemptions from Publication) (Revocation) Order (Northern Ireland) 2003 (S.R. 2003 No. 283)
 Feeding Stuffs (Sampling and Analysis) and Feeding Stuffs (Enforcement) (Amendment) Regulations (Northern Ireland) 2003 (S.R. 2003 No. 287)
 Control of Substances Hazardous to Health (Amendment) Regulations (Northern Ireland) 2003 (S.R. 2003 No. 288)
 Prisoner Release Victim Information (Northern Ireland) Scheme 2003 (S.R. 2003 No. 293)
 Housing Benefit (State Pension Credit) (Abolition of Benefit Periods Amendment) Regulations (Northern Ireland) 2003 (S.R. 2003 No. 294)
 County Court (Amendment No. 2) Rules (Northern Ireland) 2003 (S.R. 2003 No. 295)
 Magistrates' Courts (Amendment) Rules (Northern Ireland) 2003 (S.R. 2003 No. 296)
 Education (Student Support) Regulations (Northern Ireland) 2003 (S.R. 2003 No. 298)
 Contaminants in Food Regulations (Northern Ireland) 2003 (S.R. 2003 No. 299)
 Condensed Milk and Dried Milk Regulations (Northern Ireland) 2003 (S.R. 2003 No. 300)

301-400

 Specified Sugar Products Regulations (Northern Ireland) 2003 (S.R. 2003 No. 301)
 Motor Vehicle Testing Regulations (Northern Ireland) 2003 (S.R. 2003 No. 303)
 Goods Vehicles (Testing) Regulations (Northern Ireland) 2003 (S.R. 2003 No. 304)
 Fruit Juices and Fruit Nectars Regulations (Northern Ireland) 2003 (S.R. 2003 No. 305)
 Feeding Stuffs (Amendment No. 2) Regulations (Northern Ireland) 2003 (S.R. 2003 No. 306)
 Criminal Justice (2003 Order) (Commencement No. 1) Order (Northern Ireland) 2003 (S.R. 2003 No. 307)
 Social Fund (Maternity and Funeral Expenses) (General) (Amendment No. 3) Regulations (Northern Ireland) 2003 (S.R. 2003 No. 308)
 State Pension Credit (Decisions and Appeals - Amendments) Regulations (Northern Ireland) 2003 (S.R. 2003 No. 312)
 Cocoa and Chocolate Products Regulations (Northern Ireland) 2003 (S.R. 2003 No. 313)
 Misuse of Drugs (Amendment) Regulations (Northern Ireland) 2003 (S.R. 2003 No. 314)
 Pensions Appeal Tribunals (Northern Ireland) (Amendment) Rules 2003 (S.R. 2003 No. 316)
 Social Security (Claims and Payments and Miscellaneous Amendments) Regulations (Northern Ireland) 2003 (S.R. 2003 No. 317)
 Race Relations Order (Seamen Recruited Abroad) Order (Northern Ireland) 2003 (S.R. 2003 No. 318)
 Control of Pollution (Silage, Slurry and Agricultural Fuel Oil) Regulations (Northern Ireland) 2003 (S.R. 2003 No. 319)
 Health and Personal Social Services (Assessment of Resources) (Amendment) Regulations (Northern Ireland) 2003 (S.R. 2003 No. 320)
 Criminal Evidence (Northern Ireland) Order 1999 (Commencement No. 1) Order 2003 (S.R. 2003 No. 323)
 Misuse of Drugs (Amendment) (No. 2) Regulations (Northern Ireland) 2003 (S.R. 2003 No. 324)
 General Dental Services (Amendment No. 2) Regulations (Northern Ireland) 2003 (S.R. 2003 No. 325)
 Social Security (Students and Income-Related Benefits Amendment) Regulations (Northern Ireland) 2003 (S.R. 2003 No. 329)
 Working Time (Amendment No. 2) Regulations (Northern Ireland) 2003 (S.R. 2003 No. 330)
 Trade Union Elections and Ballots (Independent Scrutineer Qualifications) (Amendment) Order (Northern Ireland) 2003 (S.R. 2003 No. 331)
 Employment Relations (1999 Order) (Commencement No. 7) Order (Northern Ireland) 2003 (S.R. 2003 No. 332)
 Industrial Training Levy (Construction Industry) Order (Northern Ireland) 2003 (S.R. 2003 No. 336)
 Occupational Pension Schemes (Transfer Values and Miscellaneous Amendments) Regulations (Northern Ireland) 2003 (S.R. 2003 No. 337)
 Social Security (Working Tax Credit and Child Tax Credit Consequential Amendments No. 3) Regulations (Northern Ireland) 2003 (S.R. 2003 No. 338)
 Education (Student Support) (Amendment) Regulations (Northern Ireland) 2003 (S.R. 2003 No. 339)
 Education (Student Loans) (Amendment) Regulations (Northern Ireland) 2003 (S.R. 2003 No. 340)
 Race Relations Order (Amendment) Regulations (Northern Ireland) 2003 (S.R. 2003 No. 341)
 Air Quality Regulations (Northern Ireland) 2003 (S.R. 2003 No. 342)
 Smoke Control Areas (Exempted Fireplaces) (Amendment) Regulations (Northern Ireland) 2003 (S.R. 2003 No. 343)
 Access to Justice (Northern Ireland) Order 2003 (Commencement No. 1) Order (Northern Ireland) 2003 (S.R. 2003 No. 344)
 Company Directors Disqualification (2002 Order) (Commencement) Order (Northern Ireland) 2003 (S.R. 2003 No. 345)
 Company Directors Disqualification (2002 Order) (Transitional Provisions) Order (Northern Ireland) 2003 (S.R. 2003 No. 346)
 Companies (Disqualification Orders) Regulations (Northern Ireland) 2003 (S.R. 2003 No. 347)
 Health and Personal Social Services (Quality, Improvement and Regulation) (2003 Order) (Commencement No. 2) Order (Northern Ireland) 2003 (S.R. 2003 No. 348)
 Social Fund Winter Fuel Payment (Amendment) Regulations (Northern Ireland) 2003 (S.R. 2003 No. 349)
 Motor Hackney Carriages (Belfast) (Amendment) By-Laws (Northern Ireland) 2003 (S.R. 2003 No. 350)
 Social Security (Students and Income-Related Benefits Amendment No. 2) Regulations (Northern Ireland) 2003 (S.R. 2003 No. 351)
 Criminal Justice (2003 Order) (Commencement No. 2) Order (Northern Ireland) 2003 (S.R. 2003 No. 352)
 Food (Brazil Nuts) (Emergency Control) Regulations (Northern Ireland) 2003 (S.R. 2003 No. 353)
 Rehabilitation of Offenders (Exceptions) (Amendment) Order (Northern Ireland) 2003 (S.R. 2003 No. 355)
 Pharmaceutical Society of Northern Ireland (General) (Amendment) Regulations (Northern Ireland) 2003 (S.R. 2003 No. 356)
 Insolvent Companies (Reports on Conduct of Directors) Rules (Northern Ireland) 2003 (S.R. 2003 No. 357)
 Insolvent Companies (Disqualification of Unfit Directors) Proceedings Rules (Northern Ireland) 2003 (S.R. 2003 No. 358)
 Insolvent Partnerships (Amendment No. 2) Order (Northern Ireland) 2003 (S.R. 2003 No. 359)
 Food (Pistachios from Iran) (Emergency Control) Regulations (Northern Ireland) 2003 (S.R. 2003 No. 360)
 Food (Peanuts from China) (Emergency Control) (Amendment) Regulations (Northern Ireland) 2003 (S.R. 2003 No. 361)
 Food (Hot Chilli and Hot Chilli Products) (Emergency Control) Regulations (Northern Ireland) 2003 (S.R. 2003 No. 362)
 Food (Figs, Hazelnuts and Pistachios from Turkey) (Emergency Control No. 2) (Amendment) Regulations (Northern Ireland) 2003 (S.R. 2003 No. 363)
 Time Off for Public Duties Order (Northern Ireland) 2003 (S.R. 2003 No. 365)
 Fishing Vessel (Decommissioning) Scheme (Northern Ireland) 2003 (S.R. 2003 No. 366)
 Social Security (Back to Work Bonus and Lone Parent Run-on Amendment and Revocation) Regulations (Northern Ireland) 2003 (S.R. 2003 No. 367)
 Water Supply (Water Quality) (Amendment) Regulations (Northern Ireland) 2003 (S.R. 2003 No. 369)
 Education (Grants for Disabled Postgraduate Students) (Amendment) Regulations (Northern Ireland) 2003 (S.R. 2003 No. 370)
 Motor Vehicles (Driving Licences) (Amendment No. 3) Regulations (Northern Ireland) 2003 (S.R. 2003 No. 371)
 Police (Appointments) Regulations (Northern Ireland) 2003 (S.R. 2003 No. 372)
 State Pension Credit (2002 Act) (Commencement No. 4) and Appointed Day Order (Northern Ireland) 2003 (S.R. 2003 No. 373)
 Horse Racing (Charges on Bookmakers) Order (Northern Ireland) 2003 (S.R. 2003 No. 375)
 Police (Northern Ireland) Act 1998 (Modification) Order 2003 (S.R. 2003 No. 376)
 Food (Peanuts from Egypt) (Emergency Control) Regulations (Northern Ireland) 2003 (S.R. 2003 No. 377)
 Education (School Information and Prospectuses) Regulations (Northern Ireland) 2003 (S.R. 2003 No. 378)
 Pesticides (Maximum Residue Levels in Crops, Food and Feeding Stuffs) (Amendment) (No. 2) Regulations (Northern Ireland) 2003 (S.R. 2003 No. 379)
 Welfare of Animals (Scheduled Operations) (Amendment) Order (Northern Ireland) 2003 (S.R. 2003 No. 380)
 Time Off for Public Duties (No. 2) Order (Northern Ireland) 2003 (S.R. 2003 No. 381)
 Salaries (Assembly Ombudsman and Commissioner for Complaints) Order (Northern Ireland) 2003 (S.R. 2003 No. 382)
 Honey Regulations (Northern Ireland) 2003 (S.R. 2003 No. 383)
 Oil and Fibre Plant Seeds (Amendment) Regulations (Northern Ireland) 2003 (S.R. 2003 No. 384)
 Domestic Energy Efficiency Grants (Amendment) Regulations (Northern Ireland) 2003 (S.R. 2003 No. 385)
 Transportable Pressure Vessels Regulations (Northern Ireland) 2003 (S.R. 2003 No. 386)
 Housing Renovation etc. Grants (Reduction of Grant) (Amendment No. 3) Regulations (Northern Ireland) 2003 (S.R. 2003 No. 387)
 Social Security (Industrial Injuries) (Prescribed Diseases) (Amendment No. 2) Regulations (Northern Ireland) 2003 (S.R. 2003 No. 388)
 Social Fund Winter Fuel Payment (Amendment No. 2) Regulations (Northern Ireland) 2003 (S.R. 2003 No. 389)
 Waste Incineration Regulations (Northern Ireland) 2003 (S.R. 2003 No. 390)
 Welfare Foods (Amendment No. 2) Regulations (Northern Ireland) 2003 (S.R. 2003 No. 393)
 Pre-Sentence Report Disclosure (Prescription of Prosecutors) Order (Northern Ireland) 2003 (S.R. 2003 No. 394)
 Air Route Development (Northern Ireland) Limited (Funding) Order (Northern Ireland) 2003 (S.R. 2003 No. 395)
 Social Security (2002 Act) (Commencement No. 3) Order (Northern Ireland) 2003 (S.R. 2003 No. 396)
 Social Security (Attendance Allowance and Disability Living Allowance) (Amendment) Regulations (Northern Ireland) 2003 (S.R. 2003 No. 397)
 Social Security (Incapacity) (Miscellaneous Amendments) Regulations (Northern Ireland) 2003 (S.R. 2003 No. 398)
 Police Service of Northern Ireland (Appeals) (Amendment) Regulations 2003 (S.R. 2003 No. 399)
 Commissioner for Children and Young People (2003 Order) (Commencement) Order (Northern Ireland) 2003 (S.R. 2003 No. 400)

401-500

 Diseases of Poultry (Amendment) Order (Northern Ireland) 2003 (S.R. 2003 No. 401)
 Allocation of Housing Regulations (Northern Ireland) 2003 (S.R. 2003 No. 402)
 Homelessness Regulations (Northern Ireland) 2003 (S.R. 2003 No. 403)
 Controlled Waste (Amendment) Regulations (Northern Ireland) 2003 (S.R. 2003 No. 404)
 Social Security (Work-focused Interviews for Partners) Regulations (Northern Ireland) 2003 (S.R. 2003 No. 405)
 Food (Star Anise from Third Countries) (Emergency Control) (Revocation) Order (Northern Ireland) 2003 (S.R. 2003 No. 406)
 Travelling Expenses and Remission of Charges (Amendment No. 2) Regulations (Northern Ireland) 2003 (S.R. 2003 No. 408)
 Injunctions Against Anti-Social Behaviour (Prescribed Premises) Regulations (Northern Ireland) 2003 (S.R. 2003 No. 409)
 Introductory Tenants (Review) Regulations (Northern Ireland) 2003 (S.R. 2003 No. 410)
 Secure Tenancies (Notice) (Amendment) Regulations (Northern Ireland) 2003 (S.R. 2003 No. 411)
 Social Security (Third Party Deductions and Miscellaneous Amendments) Regulations (Northern Ireland) 2003 (S.R. 2003 No. 412)
 Income Support (General) (Amendment) Regulations (Northern Ireland) 2003 (S.R. 2003 No. 413)
 Notification of Installations Handling Hazardous Substances (Amendment) Regulations (Northern Ireland) 2003 (S.R. 2003 No. 415)
 Justice (Northern Ireland) Act 2002 (Commencement No. 4) Order 2003 (S.R. 2003 No. 416)
 Social Security (Miscellaneous Amendments No. 2) Regulations (Northern Ireland) 2003 (S.R. 2003 No. 417)
 Housing Benefit (State Pension Credit and Miscellaneous Amendments) Regulations (Northern Ireland) 2003 (S.R. 2003 No. 418)
 Misuse of Drugs (Amendment) (No. 3) Regulations (Northern Ireland) 2003 (S.R. 2003 No. 420)
 State Pension Credit (Transitional and Miscellaneous Provisions) (Amendment) Regulations (Northern Ireland) 2003 (S.R. 2003 No. 421)
 Measuring Equipment (Liquid Fuel and Lubricants) (Amendment) Regulations (Northern Ireland) 2003 (S.R. 2003 No. 422)
 Health and Safety (Miscellaneous Amendments) Regulations (Northern Ireland) 2003 (S.R. 2003 No. 423)
 Optical Charges and Payments and General Ophthalmic Services (Amendment No. 2) Regulations (Northern Ireland) 2003 (S.R. 2003 No. 424)
 Classical Swine Fever Order (Northern Ireland) 2003 (S.R. 2003 No. 425)
 Employer's Liability (Compulsory Insurance) Exemption (Amendment) Regulations (Northern Ireland) 2003 (S.R. 2003 No. 426)
 Health and Personal Social Services (Assessment of Resources) (Amendment No. 2) Regulations (Northern Ireland) 2003 (S.R. 2003 No. 428)
 Motor Vehicles (Construction and Use) (Amendment No. 3) Regulations (Northern Ireland) 2003 (S.R. 2003 No. 431)
 Housing Benefit (State Pension Credit and Miscellaneous Amendments) (Amendment) Regulations (Northern Ireland) 2003 (S.R. 2003 No. 432)
 Local Government Pension Scheme (Management and Investment of Funds) (Amendment) Regulations (Northern Ireland) 2003 (S.R. 2003 No. 433)
 Public Service Vehicles (Conditions of Fitness, Equipment and Use) (Amendment No. 2) Regulations (Northern Ireland) 2003 (S.R. 2003 No. 434)
 Pesticides (Maximum Residue Levels in Crops, Food and Feeding Stuffs) (Amendment) (No. 3) Regulations (Northern Ireland) 2003 (S.R. 2003 No. 435)
 Police Trainee (Amendment) Regulations (Northern Ireland) 2003 (S.R. 2003 No. 436)
 Legal Advice and Assistance (Amendment) Regulations (Northern Ireland) 2003 (S.R. 2003 No. 437)
 Legal Aid (General) (Amendment) Regulations (Northern Ireland) 2003 (S.R. 2003 No. 438)
 Access to Justice (Northern Ireland) Order 2003 (Commencement No. 1) (Amendment) Order (Northern Ireland) 2003 (S.R. 2003 No. 439)
 Access to Justice (Northern Ireland) Order 2003 (Commencement No. 2) Order (Northern Ireland) 2003 (S.R. 2003 No. 440)
 Planning (Amendment) (2003 Order) (Commencement No. 2) Order (Northern Ireland) 2003 (S.R. 2003 No. 443)
 Planning (Trees) Regulations (Northern Ireland) 2003 (S.R. 2003 No. 444)
 Planning (General Development) (Amendment No. 2) Order (Northern Ireland) 2003 (S.R. 2003 No. 445)
 Planning (Fees) (Amendment No. 2) Regulations (Northern Ireland) 2003 (S.R. 2003 No. 446)
 Health and Personal Social Services (Amendments Relating to Prescribing by Nurses and Pharmacists etc.) Regulations (Northern Ireland) 2003 (S.R. 2003 No. 447)
 Food (Provisions Relating to Labelling) Regulations (Northern Ireland) 2003 (S.R. 2003 No. 448)
 Public Service Vehicles (Amendment No. 2) Regulations (Northern Ireland) 2003 (S.R. 2003 No. 449)
 Smoke Control Areas (Authorised Fuels) Regulations (Northern Ireland) 2003 (S.R. 2003 No. 450)
 Management of Health and Safety at Work and Fire Precautions (Workplace) (Amendment) Regulations (Northern Ireland) 2003 (S.R. 2003 No. 454)
 Income Support (General) (Standard Interest Rate Amendment) Regulations (Northern Ireland) 2003 (S.R. 2003 No. 455)
 Marketing of Potatoes (Amendment) Regulations (Northern Ireland) 2003 (S.R. 2003 No. 456)
 Seed Potatoes (Tuber and Label Fees) (Amendment) Regulations (Northern Ireland) 2003 (S.R. 2003 No. 457)
 Plant Health (Amendment No. 2) Order (Northern Ireland) 2003 (S.R. 2003 No. 458)
 Students Awards Regulations (Northern Ireland) 2003 (S.R. 2003 No. 459)
 Police (Northern Ireland) Act 2000 (Designated Places of Detention No. 2) Order 2003 (S.R. 2003 No. 460)
 Food Protection (Emergency Prohibitions) Order (Northern Ireland) 2003 (S.R. 2003 No. 462)
 Housing Renovation etc. Grants (Grant Limit) Order (Northern Ireland) 2003 (S.R. 2003 No. 463)
 Home Repair Assistance Grant Regulations (Northern Ireland) 2003 (S.R. 2003 No. 464)
 Housing Replacement Grant Regulations (Northern Ireland) 2003 (S.R. 2003 No. 465)
 Marriage (2003 Order) (Commencement) Order (Northern Ireland) 2003 (S.R. 2003 No. 466)
 Births, Deaths and Marriages (Fees) Order (Northern Ireland) 2003 (S.R. 2003 No. 467)
 Marriage Regulations (Northern Ireland) 2003 (S.R. 2003 No. 468)
 Child Support (Miscellaneous Amendments) Regulations (Northern Ireland) 2003 (S.R. 2003 No. 469)
 Electricity (Guarantees of Origin of Electricity Produced from Renewable Energy Sources) Regulations (Northern Ireland) 2003 (S.R. 2003 No. 470)
 Crown Court (Amendment No. 3) Rules (Northern Ireland) 2003 (S.R. 2003 No. 471)
 Organic Farming (Conversion of Animal Housing) Scheme (Northern Ireland) 2003 (S.R. 2003 No. 472)
 Youth Conference Rules (Northern Ireland) 2003 (S.R. 2003 No. 473)
 Juries (Northern Ireland) Order 1996 (Amendment) Regulations 2003 (S.R. 2003 No. 474)
 Feeding Stuffs (Amendment No. 3) Regulations (Northern Ireland) 2003 (S.R. 2003 No. 475)
 Criminal Evidence (Northern Ireland) Order 1999 (Commencement No. 2) Order 2003 (S.R. 2003 No. 476)
 Magistrates' Courts (Amendment No. 2) Rules (Northern Ireland) 2003 (S.R. 2003 No. 477)
 Magistrates' Courts (Criminal Justice (Children)) (Amendment) Rules (Northern Ireland) 2003 (S.R. 2003 No. 478)
 Community Responsibility Order Rules (Northern Ireland) 2003 (S.R. 2003 No. 479)
 Reparation Order Rules (Northern Ireland) 2003 (S.R. 2003 No. 480)
 Education (Listed Bodies) Order (Northern Ireland) 2003 (S.R. 2003 No. 481)
 Election Against Benefits Regulations (Northern Ireland) 2003 (S.R. 2003 No. 482)
 Election Against Benefits (No. 2) Regulations (Northern Ireland) 2003 (S.R. 2003 No. 483)
 Food Protection (Emergency Prohibitions) (Revocation) Order (Northern Ireland) 2003 (S.R. 2003 No. 484)
 County Court (Amendment No. 3) Rules (Northern Ireland) 2003 (S.R. 2003 No. 485)
 Social Security Pensions (Home Responsibilities) (Amendment) Regulations (Northern Ireland) 2003 (S.R. 2003 No. 486)
 Occupational Pensions (Revaluation) Order (Northern Ireland) 2003 (S.R. 2003 No. 487)
 Justice (Northern Ireland) Act 2002 (Commencement No. 5) Order 2003 (S.R. 2003 No. 488)
 Waste and Contaminated Land (1997 Order) (Commencement No. 7) Order (Northern Ireland) 2003 (S.R. 2003 No. 489)
 Sheep Annual Premium (Amendment) Regulations (Northern Ireland) 2003 (S.R. 2003 No. 490)
 Measuring Instruments (EEC Requirements) (Verification Fees) Regulations (Northern Ireland) 2003 (S.R. 2003 No. 491)
 Weights and Measures (Passing as Fit for Use for Trade and Adjustment Fees) Regulations (Northern Ireland) 2003 (S.R. 2003 No. 492)
 Waste Management Licensing Regulations (Northern Ireland) 2003 (S.R. 2003 No. 493)
 African Swine Fever Order (Northern Ireland) 2003 (S.R. 2003 No. 494)
 Animal By-Products Regulations (Northern Ireland) 2003 (S.R. 2003 No. 495)
 Landfill Regulations (Northern Ireland) 2003 (S.R. 2003 No. 496)
 Employment Equality (Sexual Orientation) Regulations (Northern Ireland) 2003 (S.R. 2003 No. 497)
 Industrial Tribunals (Interest on Awards in Sexual Orientation Discrimination Cases) Regulations (Northern Ireland) 2003 (S.R. 2003 No. 498)
 Inshore Fishing (Prohibition of Fishing and Fishing Methods) (Amendment) Regulations (Northern Ireland) 2003 (S.R. 2003 No. 499)

501-600

 Domestic Energy Efficiency Grants (Amendment No. 2) Regulations (Northern Ireland) 2003 (S.R. 2003 No. 503)
 Animal By-Products (Identification) (Amendment No. 2) Regulations (Northern Ireland) 2003 (S.R. 2003 No. 504)
 Food (Brazil Nuts) (Emergency Control) (Amendment) Regulations (Northern Ireland) 2003 (S.R. 2003 No. 505)
 Land Registry (Fees) Order (Northern Ireland) 2003 (S.R. 2003 No. 506)
 Transmissible Spongiform Encephalopathy (Amendment) Regulations (Northern Ireland) 2003 (S.R. 2003 No. 509)
 Health and Safety (Fees) Regulations (Northern Ireland) 2003 (S.R. 2003 No. 510)
 Legal Aid in Criminal Proceedings (Costs) (Amendment) Rules (Northern Ireland) 2003 (S.R. 2003 No. 511)
 Legal Aid for Youth Conferences (Costs) Rules (Northern Ireland) 2003 (S.R. 2003 No. 512)
 Legal Aid Certificates (Amendment) Rules (Northern Ireland) 2003 (S.R. 2003 No. 513)
 Legal Aid in Criminal Cases (Statement of Means) (Amendment) Rules (Northern Ireland) 2003 (S.R. 2003 No. 514)
 Goods Vehicles (Community Authorisations) (Amendment of the Road Traffic (Northern Ireland) Order 1981) Regulations (Northern Ireland) 2003 (S.R. 2003 No. 515)
 Motor Vehicles (Driving Licences) (Amendment No. 4) Regulations (Northern Ireland) 2003 (S.R. 2003 No. 516)
 Motor Vehicles (Construction and Use) (Amendment No. 4) Regulations (Northern Ireland) 2003 (S.R. 2003 No. 517)
 Motor Vehicles Testing (Amendment) Regulations (Northern Ireland) 2003 (S.R. 2003 No. 518)
 Jam and Similar Products Regulations (Northern Ireland) 2003 (S.R. 2003 No. 519)
 Fair Employment and Treatment Order (Amendment) Regulations (Northern Ireland) 2003 (S.R. 2003 No. 520)
 Fair Employment (Specification of Public Authorities) (Amendment) Order (Northern Ireland) 2003 (S.R. 2003 No. 521)
 Child Support (Information, Evidence and Disclosure) (Amendment) Regulations (Northern Ireland) 2003 (S.R. 2003 No. 522)
 Dundrod Circuit (Admission Charges) Regulations (Northern Ireland) 2003 (S.R. 2003 No. 523)
 Foyle Area and Carlingford Area (Licensing of Fishing Engines) (Amendment No. 2) Regulations 2003 (S.R. 2003 No. 524)
 Fisheries Byelaws (Northern Ireland) 2003 (S.R. 2003 No. 525)
 Legal Aid in Criminal Proceedings (Costs) (Amendment No. 2) Rules (Northern Ireland) 2003 (S.R. 2003 No. 526)
 Social Security (Notification of Change of Circumstances) Regulations (Northern Ireland) 2003 (S.R. 2003 No. 527)
 Housing (2003 Order) (Commencement No. 2) Order (Northern Ireland) 2003 (S.R. 2003 No. 528)
 Infant Formula and Follow-on Formula (Amendment) Regulations (Northern Ireland) 2003 (S.R. 2003 No. 529)
 Processed Cereal-based Foods and Baby Foods for Infants and Young Children Regulations (Northern Ireland) 2003 (S.R. 2003 No. 530)
 Street Works (Recovery of Costs) Regulations (Northern Ireland) 2003 (S.R. 2003 No. 531)
 Railways Regulations (Northern Ireland) 2003 (S.R. 2003 No. 532)
 Packaging, Labelling and Carriage of Radioactive Material by Rail Regulations (Northern Ireland) 2003 (S.R. 2003 No. 533)
 Game Preservation (Special Protection for Irish Hares) Order (Northern Ireland) 2003 (S.R. 2003 No. 534)
 Miscellaneous Food Additives (Amendment No. 2) Regulations (Northern Ireland) 2003 (S.R. 2003 No. 535)
 Rules of the Supreme Court (Northern Ireland) (Amendment No. 3) 2003 (S.R. 2003 No. 536)
 Motor Vehicles (Construction and Use) (Amendment No. 5) Regulations (Northern Ireland) 2003 (S.R. 2003 No. 537)
 Registration of Establishments (Laying Hens) Regulations (Northern Ireland) 2003 (S.R. 2003 No. 538)
 Air Quality (Amendment) Regulations (Northern Ireland) 2003 (S.R. 2003 No. 543)
 Water Environment (Water Framework Directive) Regulations (Northern Ireland) 2003 (S.R. 2003 No. 544)
 Insolvency (2002 Order) (Commencement) Order (Northern Ireland) 2003 (S.R. 2003 No. 545)
 Insolvency (2002 Order) (Transitional Provisions) Order (Northern Ireland) 2003 (S.R. 2003 No. 546)
 Insolvency Practitioners (Amendment) Regulations (Northern Ireland) 2003 (S.R. 2003 No. 547)
 Marketing and Use of Dangerous Substances (No. 4) Regulations (Northern Ireland) 2003 (S.R. 2003 No. 548)
 Insolvency (Amendment) Rules (Northern Ireland) 2003 (S.R. 2003 No. 549)
 Insolvent Partnerships (Amendment No. 3) Order (Northern Ireland) 2003 (S.R. 2003 No. 550)
 Home Repair Assistance Grant (Amendment) Regulations (Northern Ireland) 2003 (S.R. 2003 No. 551)
 Justice (Northern Ireland) Act 2002 (Amendment of section 46 (C.1) and paragraph 7 (C.2) of Schedule 8) Order 2003 (S.R. 2003 No. 552)
 Flags Regulations (Northern Ireland) (Amendment) 2002 (S.R. 2003 No. 553))

External links
  Statutory Rules (NI) List
 Draft Statutory Rules (NI) List

2003
2003 in Northern Ireland
Northern Ireland Statutory Rules